Crassula sarcocaulis is a small shrubby succulent plant known by the common name bonsai crassula, due to its bonsai-like appearance.  It is a perennial plant native to the eastern half of South Africa, on mountain slopes in rocky terrain.

Description
Bonsai crassula has small pink or white flowers that appear in summer. The flowers are described as smelling like honey or blackcurrant jelly. The plant grows to about 30–50 cm (1-1.5 ft) high and wide.

Cultivation
This hardy little plant is among the most tolerant of cold temperatures in its genus, down to around -12 °C (10 °F), as well as being heat-tolerant
It is a recipient of the British Royal Horticultural Society's Award of Garden Merit, in part due to its hardiness in UK growing conditions.

It is drought-tolerant and generally disease-free, but can be affected by aphids, mealybugs, and vine weevils.
It can be grown indoors or outdoors, with full or partial sunshine, but full sunlight is preferred.
Like most succulents, it prefers well-drained soil and only occasional watering.

Gallery

References

The Plant List entry

External links

San Marcos Growers profile of Crassula sarcocaulis

sarcocaulis
Flora of South Africa
Plants used in bonsai